The Cleveland mayoral election of 1945 saw the election of Thomas A. Burke.

General election

References

Mayoral elections in Cleveland
Cleveland mayoral
Cleveland
November 1945 events in the United States
1940s in Cleveland